Myrcia densiflora is a species of tree in the family Myrtaceae. It is found in South America from Bolivia, Brazil (Acre), Ecuador and Peru. It has simple, broad leaves.

References

densiflora
Taxonomy articles created by Polbot
Taxa named by Eduard Friedrich Poeppig